Litargus connexus is a species of beetle belonging to the family Mycetophagidae.

It is native to Europe and Northern America.

References

Tenebrionoidea